Ferrari is a 2003 Italian biopic based on the book by Enzo Biagi. It depicts Enzo Ferrari's rise from a successful race driver to one of the most famous entrepreneurs of all time. Being interviewed by a fictitious, intrusive young journalist he recalls his setbacks and personal losses. He also expresses his regrets about race drivers who met with an accident. The film finishes with a dedication by Piero Ferrari: "In loving memory of my father and of my brother Dino". Due to its success the original TV miniseries was edited for cinema.

Plot
When he is only ten years old, Enzo Ferrari runs to the next village only to watch a car race. Now the direction for his life is set. He starts immediately working on vehicles and as soon as he is old enough to drive a real car, he becomes a race car driver.

Soon the young man shows ambitions in finding a racing team. He offers his services to Fiat but the team managers turn him down. Yet Alfa Romeo hires Ferrari and promotes him to team manager.

With gusto Ferrari takes his family to the races. His wife objects to the noise and considers this environment inappropriate for little Dino, but Enzo's enthusiasm knows no restraint. He is determined to raise him as his successor.

Ferrari's reputation grows and enables him to create his own company, Scuderia Ferrari. When he presents his employees (including Giuseppe Campari and Tazio Nuvolari) to the press, he explains that enthusiasm can be contagious. But when German troops come to Italy, Ferrari is accused of building weapons for the Italian resistance. Although one of the officers is a former racing driver and a fan of Ferrari and tries to protect him, Ferrari must hide.

After the war Enzo Ferrari rebuilds his destroyed factory, and begins pushing himself to his limits. Once he is back in business and has recovered from exhaustion, he finds out that Dino suffers with an especially severe form of muscular dystrophy. Enzo regrets not having spent more time with him, a thought which will haunt him for the rest of his life.

Cast
Sergio Castellitto as Enzo Ferrari
Ed Stoppard as Ferrari's alter ego
Cristina Moglia as Laura Garello
Jessica Brooks as Lina Lardi
Matthew Bose as Dino
Pierfrancesco Favino as Filippo
Jonathan Bailey as Alfredo Ferrari
Vincent Schiavelli as Mr. Paradise
Francesca De Sapio  as Adalgisa Ferrari                 
Elio Germano as Enzo Ferrari at 18 years old
Skandar Keynes as Enzo Ferrari at 8 years old
Anton Alexander as Lawyer to Enzo Ferrari
Anthony Souter as Journalist

 Pastor Maldonado as Tazio Nuvolari

References

External links
 

2003 television films
2003 films
2000s Italian television miniseries
Italian biographical films
English-language Italian films
Italian auto racing films
Formula One mass media
Films set in the 20th century
Films directed by Carlo Carlei
2000s biographical films
2000s English-language films
Enzo Ferrari